Ucayali is an inland department and region of Peru. Located in the Amazon rainforest, its name is derived from the Ucayali River. Its capital is the city of Pucallpa. It is the second largest department in Peru, after Loreto.

Geography

Boundaries
The department of Ucayali is bordered by the Brazilian state of Acre on the east; the department of Madre de Dios on the southeast; Cusco on the south; Junín, Pasco and Huánuco on the west; and Loreto on the north.

Demographics

Population
According to the 2007 Census, the Ucayali department has a population of 432,159 inhabitants, 51.4% of which (222,132) are male and 48.6% (210,027) are female. 75.3% of the population (325,347) live in urban areas while the remaining 24.7% (106,812) live in rural areas.

, the Instituto Nacional de Estadística e Informática estimated the department's population to be 468,922.

Languages
Spanish is spoken as a first language by 87.6% of the population, while 4.1% speak Asháninka, 1.5% speak Quechua and 0.1% speak Aymara. Other indigenous languages, including Shipibo, are spoken by 6.6% of the population and 0.0% speak foreign languages.

Immigration
Persons originating from other departments of the country make up 34.7% of the population and 0.2% of residents were born abroad.

The largest immigrant groups come from the Loreto Region (12.5% of the total population).

Age
The population is spread out, with 53.9% under the age of 20, 9.3% from 20 to 24, 25.4% from 25 to 44, 8.8% from 45 to 64, and 2.5% who are 65 years of age or older.

Education
Secondary education has been attended by 29% of the population and 2.3% also have graduated from non-university higher education, while 1.7% have complete university studies. 49.3% only have attended primary education and 9.1% have not had any education.

The illiteracy rate in the region is 14.2%

Political division
The department is divided into 4 provinces (singular: provincia), which are composed of 14 districts (distritos, singular: distrito).

Provinces
The provinces, with their capitals in parentheses, are:

 Atalaya (Atalaya)
 Coronel Portillo (Pucallpa)
 Padre Abad (Aguaytía)
 Purús (Esperanza)

Places of interest 
 El Sira Communal Reserve
 Gran Pajonal 
 Purús Communal Reserve
 Immaculate Conception Cathedral, Pucallpa

References

External links
  Gobierno Regional de Ucayali  – Ucayali Regional Government website

 
Regions of Peru